Relativity was a Scots-Irish quartet formed in 1985 consisting of two Scottish brothers and an Irish brother and sister. The four members of the band were brothers Johnny Cunningham (fiddle) and Phil Cunningham (accordion, keyboard, whistle, bodhran), and Irish sister and brother Tríona Ní Dhomhnaill (vocals, clavinet) and Mícheál Ó Domhnaill (vocals, guitar, keyboard). Each of the members enjoyed a flourishing solo career at the time Relativity was formed.

Discography 
 Relativity (1985)
 Gathering Pace (1987)

References 

Celtic music groups
Irish folk musical groups
Musical groups established in 1985
Musical groups disestablished in 1987
1985 establishments in Europe
1987 disestablishments in Europe
Green Linnet Records artists